This is a list of schools in the London Borough of Brent, England.

State-funded schools

Primary schools
Source. (CE indicates Church of England, RC Roman Catholic, J Jewish, I Islamic).

Anson Primary School
Ark Academy
Ark Franklin Primary Academy
Avigdor Hirsch Torah Temimah Primary School (J)
Barham Primary School
Braintcroft E-Act Primary Academy
Brentfield Primary School
Byron Court Primary School
Carlton Vale Infant School
Chalkhill Primary School
Christ Church Primary School (CE)
Convent of Jesus & Mary Infant School (RC)
Donnington Primary School
East Lane Primary School
Elsley Primary School
Fryent Primary School
Furness Primary School
Gladstone Park Primary School
Harlesden Primary School
Islamia Primary School (I)
John Keble Primary School (CE)
Kilburn Grange School
The Kilburn Park School
Kingsbury Green Primary School
Leopold Primary School
Lyon Park Primary School
Malorees Infant School
Malorees Junior School
Michael Sobell Sinai School (J)
Mitchell Brook Primary School
Mora Primary School
Mount Stewart Infant School
Mount Stewart Junior School
Newfield Primary School
North West London Jewish Day School (J)
Northview Junior and Infant School
Oakington Manor Primary School
Oliver Goldsmith Primary School
Our Lady of Grace Infant School (RC)
Our Lady of Grace Junior School (RC)
Our Lady of Lourdes Primary School (RC)
Park Lane Primary School
Preston Manor School
Preston Park Primary School
Princess Frederica Primary School (CE)
Roe Green Infant School
Roe Green Junior School
St Andrew & St Francis Primary School (CE)
St Joseph's Infant School (RC)
St Joseph's Junior School (RC)
St Joseph's Primary School (RC)
St Margaret Clitherow Primary School (RC)
St Mary Magdalen's Junior School (RC)
St Mary's Primary School (CE)
St Mary's Primary School (RC)
St Robert Southwell Primary School (RC)
Salusbury Primary School
The Stonebridge School
Sudbury Primary School
Uxendon Manor Primary School
Wembley Primary School
Wykeham Primary School

Secondary schools

Source.

Alperton Community School
Ark Academy
Ark Elvin Academy
Capital City Academy
Claremont High School
E-ACT Crest Academy
JFS
Kingsbury High School
Michaela Community School
Newman Catholic College
North Brent School
Preston Manor School
Queens Park Community School
St Claudine's Catholic School for Girls
St Gregory's RC Science College*
Wembley High Technology College

*This school is located within The London Borough of Harrow but accepts pupils from Brent

Special and alternative schools

The Avenue
Ashley College 
Brent River College
Manor School
Phoenix Arch School
Roundwood School 
The Village School
Woodfield School

Further education
College of North West London

Independent schools

Primary and preparatory schools
Advance Education
Bnos Beis Yaakov Primary School
Buxlow Preparatory School
Maple Walk School
St Christopher's School

Senior and all-through schools
Al-Sadiq School
Al-Zahra School
Brondesbury College
Islamia School for Girls
Lycée International de Londres Winston Churchill
Menorah High School
The School of the Islamic Republic of Iran

Special and alternative schools
The Corner School
Edith Kay Independent School
Gesher School
New Level Academy
Southover Partnership School

References

External links
Schools - Brent London Borough Council

 
Brent